Wings Aviation was a charter airline based in Lagos, Nigeria. It operates customised air charter services. Its main base is Murtala Mohammed International Airport, Lagos.

History
The Nigerian government set a deadline of 30 April 2007 for all airlines operating in the country to re-capitalise or be grounded, in an effort to ensure better services and safety. The airline satisfied the Nigerian Civil Aviation Authority (NCAA)'s criteria in terms of re-capitalization and was re-registered for operation. It later merged with JedAir.

Fleet
 1 Raytheon Beech 1900D Airliner
 1 Beechcraft Super King Air

Incidents and accidents
Wings Aviation lost an aircraft in 2008, the wreckage was only found after a few months.

References

Defunct airlines of Nigeria
Companies based in Lagos